Asaperda chongqingensis is a species of beetle in the family Cerambycidae. It was described by Chen and Chiang in 1993.

References

Asaperda
Beetles described in 1993